Lord Radio & the Bimshire Boys were a Barbadian calypso band who helped to pioneer the Barbadian calypso scene in the 1950s and 60s.  The name Bimshire comes from a Bajan dialect term for Barbados. 

Their albums include Rhymes in Rhythm, The Midget and The Giant and You Asked For It.

References

 

Barbadian musical groups
Calypso musical groups
1950s establishments in Barbados